Heinz is a German given name, a diminutive of Heinrich and cognate of the given name Henry. People with this given name include:

People with the given name Heinz 
 Heinz Allersmeier (1917–2001), German Army officer in World War II
 Heinz von Allmen (1913–2003), Swiss Olympic skier
 Heinz Alt (1922–1945), German composer and victim of the Nazi regime
 Heinz Anger (born 1941), Austrian painter
 Heinz Ansbacher (1904–2006), German-American psychologist
 Heinz Arndt (1915–2002), Australian economist
 Heinz Arnold (1919–1945), German Luftwaffe fighter ace
 Heinz Arzberger (born 1972), Austrian football player
 Heinz Auerswald (1908–1970), German lawyer and member of the SS
 Heinz Barwich (1911–1966), German nuclear physicist
 Heinz Burt (1942–2000), German-born British pop singer
 Heinz Edelmann (1934–2009), German illustrator and designer
 Heinz Erhardt (1909–1979), German comedian, entertainer and actor
 Heinz Fischer (born 1938), President of Austria
 Heinz von Foerster (1911–2002), Austrian-American physicist and philosopher
 Heinz Galinski (1912–1992), president of the Central Council of Jews in Germany
 Heinz Guderian (1888–1954), German general during World War II, one of the principal commanders of Eastern Front (World War II) and Battle of Moscow 
 Heinz-Günther Guderian (1914–2004), German officer in the Wehrmacht and later NATO, son of Heinz Guderian
 Heinz Günthardt (born 1959), Swiss tennis player
 Heinz van Haaren (born 1940), Dutch football player
 Heinz-Harald Frentzen (born 1967), German racing driver
 Heinz Heck (1894–1982), German biologist and zoo director
 Heinz Werner Höber (1931–1996), prolific pulp fiction author
 Heinz Hoenig (born 1951), German actor 
 Heinz Höher (1938–2019), German footballer
 Heinz Höhne (1926–2010), German journalist and historian
 Heinz Hopf (1894–1971), German mathematician
 Heinz-Otto Kreiss (1930–2015), German mathematician
 Heinz Kühn (1912–1992), German politician 
 Heinz Rudolf Kunze (born 1956), German singer 
 Heinz-Georg Lemm (1919–1994), German military officer
 Heinz Linge (1913–1980), SS officer who served as Adolf Hitler's valet
 Heinz A. Lowenstam (1912–1993), German-born, Jewish-American paleoecologist
 Heinz von Lichberg (1890–1951), German author known for his 1916 short story Lolita
 Heinz Magenheimer (born 1943), Austrian historical revisionist
 Heinz Mayr (born 1935), German racewalker
 Heinz Plank (born 1945), German painter, draughtsman and graphic artist
 Heinz von Randow (1890–1942), German army general in World War II
 Heinz Raack (1917-2002), German hockey player
 Heinz Rühmann (1902–1994), German actor
 Heinz Spoerli (born 1940), Swiss choreographer
 Heinz Staab (1926–2012), German chemist and director of the Max Planck Society
 Heinz Steinberger (born 1958), Austrian ice speed skater
 Heinz-Christian Strache (born 1969), Austrian politician and former Vice-Chancellor
 Heinz Winckler (born 1978), singer, winner of the first South Africa Idols competition
 Heinz Wolff (1928–2017), German-British scientist and TV presenter
 Heinz Zander (born 1939), German artist and writer

People better known by other names 
 Heinz Alfred Kissinger (Henry Kissinger), German-born American academic, political scientist, diplomat, and businessman
 Heinz Horst Bodo Dettke  (Bodo Dettke), a Solomon Islands politician
 Heinz Kurt Bolender (Kurt Bolender), SS officer in World War II
 Heinz Strobl (Gandalf), Austrian New Age composer
 Heinz-Frederic Jolles (Henry Jolles), a German pianist and composer
 Heinz-Georg Kramm (Heino), German singer and entertainer

Fictional characters 
 Heinz, a character from the Japanese animated film Memories
 Heinz, a Dutch comic strip about a grumpy, sarcastic cat by René Windig and Eddie de Jong.
 Heinz Doofenshmirtz, a fictional character from Phineas and Ferb
 Heinz Kruger, a German spy during World War II in the Marvel Comics universe
 Heinz Thorvald, character in the 1999 novel War of the Rats
 Heinz Thorvald, character in the 2001 film Enemy at the Gates
Heinz, main character in Luka Karnstein's "The Meeting Place"

See also 
 Heinz (surname)
 Hines (name)
 Heinrich (given name)
 Heinz (disambiguation)